Dover Township is one of twenty townships in Fayette County, Iowa, USA.  As of the 2010 census, its population was 465.

Geography
According to the United States Census Bureau, Dover Township covers an area of 37.33 square miles (96.68 square kilometers).

Unincorporated towns
 Dover Mills at 
 Eldorado at 
(This list is based on USGS data and may include former settlements.)

Adjacent townships
 Military Township, Winneshiek County (north)
 Bloomfield Township, Winneshiek County (northeast)
 Clermont Township (east)
 Pleasant Valley Township (southeast)
 Union Township (south)
 Windsor Township (southwest)
 Auburn Township (west)
 Washington Township, Winneshiek County (northwest)

Cemeteries
The township contains these six cemeteries: Auburn Township, Bethany, Dover Township, George, Nutting and Saint Peter.

Major highways
  Iowa Highway 150

Landmarks
 Dutton Cave County Park
 Goeken County Park

School districts
 North Fayette Valley Community School District

Political districts
 Iowa's 1st congressional district
 State House District 18
 State Senate District 9

References
 United States Census Bureau 2008 TIGER/Line Shapefiles
 United States Board on Geographic Names (GNIS)
 United States National Atlas

External links
 US-Counties.com
 City-Data.com

Townships in Fayette County, Iowa
Townships in Iowa